Jorge Washington Larrañaga Fraga (8 August 1956 – 22 May 2021) was an Uruguayan politician of the National Party (PN) who was Minister of the Interior from 1 March 2020 until his death. He also previously served as Intendant of Paysandú from 1990 to 1999, as well as a Senator between 2000 and 2020.

Background

Larrañaga grew up and attended school in Paysandú. He studied law at the Universidad de la República and practiced until 1990, specializing in civil and labour law.

He took a series of administrative posts in the National Party, culminating in his presidency of the Party's departmental commission in Paysandú (1985–1989).

Prominence in the National Party

He was elected Intendant in 1989  and won a second term in 1994.  He unsuccessfully contested internal party elections for vice presidential candidate in 1999. Technically it was Juan Andrés Ramírez who was running for presidential candidate that year. Had Ramírez won, it was assumed the National Convention of the National Party would choose Larrañaga as the vice presidential candidate as Ramírez–Larrañaga were seen as a joint ticket.

Soon the National Alliance ("Alianza Nacional") sector was founded and during the presidency of Jorge Batlle Ibáñez they increasingly became opponents.

In 2004 he won the internal party election and was chosen as the party's presidential candidate.

Presidential elections

2004 
On 31 October 2004 a national election was held. Larrañaga obtained over 34% of the vote. The election was won by Tabaré Vázquez who obtained over 50% of the vote.

2009 
In June 2009, he ran again in the internal party election looking to be presidential candidate. This election was won by Luis Alberto Lacalle and Larrañaga was to be the candidate to the vice presidency in the October general elections.

2014 
In June 2014, Larrañaga ran in the internal party election, losing to Luis Alberto Lacalle Pou. Afterwards he ran as his running mate.

2019 
In June 2019, Larrañaga ran in the internal party election, losing to Luis Alberto Lacalle Pou. Larrañaga was a candidate to the Senate.
He also promoted the 2019 Uruguayan constitutional referendum on public security. No presidential candidate endorsed his proposal, but many are proposing similar measures.

Death 
On 22 May 2021, Larrañaga suddenly died of a heart attack. He was mourned by the government and several political figures of all ideologies.

References

External links

1956 births
2021 deaths
20th-century Uruguayan lawyers

Candidates for President of Uruguay
National Party (Uruguay) politicians
Members of the Senate of Uruguay
Intendants of Paysandú Department
Uruguayan vice-presidential candidates
Interior ministers of Uruguay
People from Paysandú
University of the Republic (Uruguay) alumni
Uruguayan people of Spanish descent
Uruguayan people of Basque descent
Burials in Paysandú Department